Parliamentary elections were held in Laos on 21 December 1997. A total of 159 candidates contested the 99 seats, all but four of which were Lao People's Revolutionary Party members. All candidates were pre-screened by the LPRP. The LPRP won 98 seats, with an independent winning the remaining seat. Voter turnout was reported to be 99.4%.

Results

References

Laos
Elections in Laos
1997 in Laos
One-party elections
Election and referendum articles with incomplete results